The Queen's Own Lowland Yeomanry was a British Army unit formed in 1956 and disbanded in 1975.

History
The regiment was formed through the amalgamation of the Lanarkshire Yeomanry, The Queen's Own Royal Glasgow Yeomanry, and 1st/2nd Lothians and Border Horse Yeomanry in October 1956. It was reduced to a cadre in 1969 and disbanded in 1975.

References

Yeomanry regiments of the British Army